Kostyantyn Masyk is a Ukrainian state official and diplomat.

Masyk was born in Volochysk on 9 July 1936. A graduate of the Gorky Institute of Water Transport Engineers, his working career Masyk started at the Kyiv factory of ship construction and repair in 1959-60. In 1960s he became an activist of Komsomol of Ukraine becoming its first secretary in Kyiv and Kyiv Oblast.

In 1962 Masyk joined the Communist Party of the Soviet Union and finished the Higher Party School. In 1970s he served on the party's positions in Kyiv and Odessa. In 1980s Masyk was a deputy chairman of council of ministers of the Ukrainian SSR and the First secretary of the Kyiv city party committee.

In 1990-1992 Masyk was a first deputy chairman and vice-prime Minister of Ukraine and was acting head of government soon after ousting of Vitaliy Masol following the 1990 Kyiv students' hunger strike.

In 1992–1997 he served as an ambassador of Ukraine to Finland and after that director of Nadra Bank.

Later Masyk joined Party of Regions.

References

External links
 Havrylova, I. Kostyantyn Masyk: We need Moses. The desert in Ukraine already exists (Костянтин МАСИК: Нам потрібен Мойсей. Пустеля в Україні вже є). The Day. 4 June 1999.
 Political old-timer (ПОЛИТИЧЕСКИЙ ДОЛГОЖИТЕЛЬ). Mirror Weekly. 30 June 1995
 Sheremeta, Ye. Kostyantyn Masyk: The King of Sweden himself was running to his bedroom for a chair for my interpreter. Now that interpreter is an ambassador of Ukraine in Libya (Константин масик: «сам король швеции бегал в спальню за стулом для моего переводчика. Сейчас этот переводчик -- посол украины в ливии»). Fakty. 2 February 2001.
 Portnikov, V. September. Masyk (ВЕРЕСЕНЬ. МАСИК). Mirror Weekly. 19 September 2003
 Meeting of students and teachers KNUTD with a head of the State Commission on liquidation of emergency at the Chornobyl Atomic Electrical Station (ChAES) (Зустріч студентів та викладачів КНУТД з головою Урядової комісії з ліквідації аварії на ЧАЕС (1986 р.) Масиком Костянтином Івановичем). Kyiv National University of Technology and Design (KNUTD). 28 April 2017.

1936 births
Living people
People from Volochysk
Tenth convocation members of the Verkhovna Rada of the Ukrainian Soviet Socialist Republic
Eleventh convocation members of the Verkhovna Rada of the Ukrainian Soviet Socialist Republic
Acting chairpersons of the Council of Ministers of Ukraine
First deputy chairpersons of the Council of Ministers of Ukraine
First vice prime ministers of Ukraine
Central Committee of the Communist Party of Ukraine (Soviet Union) members
Party of Regions politicians
Ambassadors of Ukraine to Finland
Ambassadors of Ukraine to Sweden